The following lists events that have happened in 1834 in the Qajar dynasty, Iran.

Incumbents
 Monarch: Fat′h-Ali Shah Qajar (until October 23), Mohammad Shah Qajar (starting October 23)

Events
 Mohammad Shah Qajar ascended to the throne.

Death
 October 23 – Fath-Ali Shah Qajar, the second king of Qajar dynasty, died in Isfahan at the age of 62.

References

 
Iran
Years of the 19th century in Iran
1830s in Iran
Iran